The 1990 Idaho Vandals football team represented the University of Idaho in the 1990 NCAA Division I-AA football season. The Vandals were led by second-year head coach John L. Smith, were members of the Big Sky Conference and played their home games at the Kibbie Dome, an indoor facility on campus in Moscow, Idaho.

The three-time defending conference champion Vandals made the I-AA playoffs for the sixth consecutive season, under a third head coach. Nussmeier's season was ended by a broken right ankle in early  and fifth-year senior Steve Nolan guided the team to seven consecutive  including a ninth-straight victory over rival Boise State.

The season ended in the quarterfinals in December, where Idaho lost by one point at  the eventual national champion.

Schedule

Roster

All-conference
Four Vandals made the all-conference team: running back Devon Pearce, wide receiver Kasey Dunn, cornerback Charlie Oliver, and defensive end  Second team selections were guard Chris Hoff, tight end Scott Dahlquist, linebacker Jimmy Jacobs, and punter Joe Carrasco. Honorable mention were quarterback Steve Nolan, center Mike Rice, return specialist Roman Carter, and linebacker Mark Matthews.

Pearce shared the Big Sky's outstanding offensive player award with quarterback Jamie Martin of

References

External links
 Gem of the Mountains: 1991 University of Idaho yearbook – 1990 football season
 Idaho Argonaut – student newspaper – 1990 editions

Idaho
Idaho Vandals football seasons
Big Sky Conference football champion seasons
Idaho Vandals football